In Murbad, in the state of Maharashtra in India, there are about 206 villages. The population of Murbad is 18,725 people.

A
 Agashi	Murbad	850 
 Alawe	Murbad	351 
 Alyani	Murbad	309 
 Ambe Tembhe	Murbad	554 
 Ambegaon	Murbad	1,020 
 Ambele Bk.	Murbad	1,086 
 Ambele Kh.	Murbad	795 
 Ambiwali	Murbad	267 
 Anandnagar	Murbad	487 
 Anandnagar	Murbad	552 
 Askot	Murbad	356 
 Asole	Murbad	1,534 
 Asose	Murbad	681 
 Awalegaon	Murbad	743

B
 Balegaon	Murbad	1,193
 Bandhivali	Murbad	858 
 Bhadane, Murbad	1,354 
 Bhaluk	Murbad	1,289 
 Bhorande	Murbad	64 
 Bhuwan	Murbad	1,188 
 Borgaon	Murbad	884 
 Boriwali	Murbad	418 
 Brahmangaon	Murbad	555 
 Bursunge	Murbad	533

C
 Chafe Tarf Khedul	Murbad	303 
 Chandrapur	Murbad	596 
 Chasole	Murbad	907 
 Chikhale	Murbad	454 
 Chirad	Murbad	408

Dohlyacha pada 
 Dahigaon	Murbad	776
 Dahigaon	Murbad	496 
 Dahivali	Murbad	585 
 Dangurle	Murbad	640 
 Dehanoli	Murbad	865 
 Dehari	Murbad	610 
 Deogaon	Murbad	2,645 
 Deoghar	Murbad	105 
 Deope	Murbad	720 
 Dhanivali	Murbad	1,440 
 Dhargaon	Murbad	999 
 Dhasai	Murbad	3,053 
 Dighephal	Murbad	105 
 Diwanpada	Murbad	298 
 Dongar Nhave	Murbad	1,827 
 Dudhanoli	Murbad	710
 Durgapur	Murbad	875

E
 Eklahare	Murbad	521

F
 Fangaloshi	Murbad	806 
 Fangane	Murbad	496 
 Fangulgavhan	Murbad	1,201 
 Fansoli	Murbad	1,301

G
 Ganeshpur	Murbad	885 
 Ganeshpur	Murbad	459 
 Gawali	Murbad	943 
 Ghagurli	Murbad	342 
 Ghorale	Murbad	796 
 Gorakhgad	Murbad	1 
 Goregaon	Murbad	495

H
 Hedavali	Murbad	281 
 Hireghar	Murbad	225

I
 Inde	Murbad	885

J
 Jadai	Murbad	491 
 Jaigaon	Murbad	496 
 Jambhurde	Murbad	1,330 
 Jamghar	Murbad	533

K
 Kachakoli	Murbad	869 
 Kalambad Mu	Murbad	408 
 Kalambhe	Murbad	1,299 
 Kalamkhande	Murbad	987 
 Kalanbhad	Murbad	1,017 
 Kandali	Murbad	295 
 Kanharle	Murbad	798 
 Kanhol	Murbad	822 
 Karavale	Murbad	1,118 
 Karchonde	Murbad	731
 Kasgaon	Murbad	524 
 Kedurli	Murbad	919 
 Khandape	Murbad	1,066 
 Khandare	Murbad	606 
 Khanivare	Murbad	825 
 Khapari	Murbad	1,318 
 Kharshet Umbroli	Murbad	953 
 Khateghar	Murbad	963 
 Khed	Murbad	493 
 Khedale	Murbad	623 
 Kheware	Murbad	814 
 Khopivali	Murbad	1,333 
 Khutal Bangla	Murbad	510 
 Khutal Baragaon	Murbad	1,747 
 Khutarwadigaon	Murbad	442
 Kisal	Murbad	1,150 
 Kishor	Murbad	1,067 
 Kochare Bk.	Murbad	415 
 Kochare Kh.	Murbad	182 
 Kole	Murbad	267 
 Koloshi	Murbad	821 
 Kolthan	Murbad	1,065 
 Kondesakhare	Murbad	623 
 Korawale	Murbad	1,793 
 Kudavali	Murbad	2,189 
 Kudshet	Murbad	559

M
 Madh	Murbad	798 
 Mahaj	Murbad	596 
 Majgaon	Murbad	899 
 Mal	Murbad	3,123
 Malegaon	Murbad	1,044 
 Malhed	Murbad	1,181 
 Malinagar	Murbad	905 
 Mandus	Murbad	355 
 Mandwat	Murbad	177 
 Mangaon	Murbad	395 
 Mangaon	Murbad	324 
 Manivali Bk.	Murbad	1,407 
 Manivali Kh.	Murbad	979 
 Manivali Shirvali	Murbad	1,480 
 Manivali Tarf Khedul	Murbad	419 
 Masale	Murbad	2,033 
 Merdi	Murbad	988 
 Mharas	Murbad	799 
 Mhase	Murbad	1,242
 Milhe	Murbad	985 
 Mohaghar	Murbad	1,109 
 Mohap	Murbad	392 
 Moharai	Murbad	633 
 Mohghar	Murbad	227 
 Moroshi	Murbad	142

N
 Nadhai	Murbad	1,116 
 Nagaon	Murbad	1,435 
 Nandeni	Murbad	427 
 Nandgaon	Murbad	699 
 Narayangaon	Murbad	429 
 Narivali	Murbad	1,658 
 Nevalpada	Murbad	912 
 Nhave	Murbad	928 
 Nyahadi	Murbad	781

O
 Ojiwale	Murbad	380

P
 Padale	Murbad	644 
 Palu	Murbad	489 
 Panshet	Murbad	510 
 Pargaon	Murbad	526 
 Parhe	Murbad	705 
 Paronde	Murbad	406 
 Pasheni	Murbad	232 
 Patgaon	Murbad	628 
 Pawale	Murbad	1,191 
 Pendhari	Murbad	281 
 Pimpalgaon	Murbad	854 
 Pimpalghar	Murbad	283 
 Potgaon	Murbad	1,013

R
 Rampur	Murbad	945
 Ranjangaon	Murbad	338 
 Rao	Murbad	442

S
 Sajai	Murbad	1,489 
 Sajgaon	Murbad	194 
 Sakhare	Murbad	527 
 Sakurli	Murbad	710 
 Sangam	Murbad	691 
 Saralgaon	Murbad	2,057 
 Sasane	Murbad	1,146 
 Sawarne	Murbad	541 
 Sayale	Murbad	722 
 Shai	Murbad	744 
 Shastrinagar	Murbad	1,450 
 Shedali	Murbad	804 
 Shelgaon	Murbad	743 
 Shidgaon	Murbad	535 
 Shiravali	 Murbad 1,891
 Shirgaon	Murbad	1,243 
 Shiroshi	Murbad	1,130 
 Shirpur	Murbad	424 
 Shivale	Murbad	1,952 
 Sidhgad	Murbad	280
 Singapur	Murbad	957 
 Sonavale	Murbad	1,164 
 Songaon	Murbad	790

T
 Talegaon	Murbad	1,395 
 Talekhal	Murbad	489 
 Talvali Bargaon	Murbad	1,229 
 Talwali Tarf Ghorad	Murbad	1,067 
 Tembhare Bk.	Murbad	850
 Temgaon	Murbad	334 
 Thakare Nagar	Murbad	913 
 Vaishakhare	Murbad	210 
 Thune	Murbad	740 
 Tokawade	Murbad	1,106 
 Tondali	Murbad	842 
 Tulai	Murbad	1,102

U
 Uchale	Murbad	862 
 Udaldon	Murbad	56 
 Umaroli Bk.	Murbad	738 
 Umbarpada	Murbad	1,456 
 Umbroli Kh.	Murbad	898

V
 Vadgaon	Murbad	616 
 Vaishakhare	Murbad	1,587 
 Vehare	Murbad	474
 Veluk	Murbad	1,360 
 Vidhe	Murbad	1,188 
 Vidhyanagar	Murbad	316

W
 Wadu	Murbad	107 
 Wadvali	Murbad	1,742 
 Waghgaon	Murbad	639 
 Waghivali	Murbad	1,204 
 Walhivale	Murbad	1,381 
 Wanjale	Murbad	863 
 Wanote	Murbad	154

Z
 Zadghar	Murbad	1,505

References

Thane district